Felice Polanzani (or Polanzi) (c. 1700 - after 1771) was an Italian engraver.

Polanzani was born at Noale, near Venice, but worked mainly in Rome, where he engraved a set of twenty-two plates, representing the Life of the Virgin based on designs some attributed to Nicolas Poussin, others to Jacobo Stella.  He also engraved works of Van Dyck, Carlo Cignani, Marco Benefial, and G. Noyan.

References

18th-century Italian painters
Italian male painters
Italian engravers
1700s births
Year of death unknown
Artists from the Metropolitan City of Venice
18th-century Italian male artists